Vidyasagar Metropolitan College is located in Kolkata (Calcutta), India. It is a government-aided college that offers undergraduate courses. The students get B.A, B.Sc or B.Com degree from the University of Calcutta depending on subjects they choose. The college has an equipped library as well as physics, chemistry and biology laboratories. Students from all over the state of West Bengal come to study in this college. Employers have conducted on campus job interviews in the academic year 2006-2007 and selected students for highly paid and lucrative jobs, primarily in the booming local software industry.

In recent times this college has organised seminars in important topics both in the fields of literature as well as science. The topics include:

(i) Trends in Indian poetry

(ii) Religious reforms in eastern India

(iii) Game theory of Mathematics

(iv) Civilian use of nuclear power

(v) Interpretation of Quantum Theory.

(vi) Differential Equations (Sponsored by Dept. of Higher Edn. Govt. of. WB, 2011)

(vii) Engendering and related social issues (UGC sponsored National Level, 2011)

The Department of English has also organised a paper presentation session on the usage of supernatural elements in European literature.

The Department of Physics organises science exhibitions to popularise scientific temperament among the local school children. Students of neighbouring schools demonstrate scientific models and scientific
experiments which are designed and fabricated by them. For organising this exhibition Department of Physics gets financial support from the Indian Physics Teachers Association.

Accreditation
The University Grants Commission has approved research grant for advanced research in theoretical physics, which is conducted in this college. The college faculty has published a number of important research articles in peer reviewed journals of physics such as the Physical Review Letters.

See also 
List of colleges affiliated to the University of Calcutta
Education in India
Education in West Bengal

References

External links

University of Calcutta affiliates
Educational institutions established in 1960
Universities and colleges in Kolkata
1960 establishments in West Bengal